The Gibraltar national under-19 football team represents Gibraltar in football competitions at under-19 level and is controlled by the Gibraltar Football Association. It is  a full member of FIFA and is therefore  eligible to enter any FIFA-sanctioned tournaments.  Gibraltar applied for full UEFA membership and was accepted by the UEFA Congress in May 2013 and can therefore compete in the UEFA European Under-19 Championship beginning with the 2014 edition of the tournament.

UEFA Acceptance
Since being accepted into UEFA in May 2013, they have played three competitive matches for the qualifying round of the 2014 UEFA European Under-19 Championship. They were drawn into Group 1 with Czech Republic, Cyprus and Croatia. Czech Republic were the hosts of the group and all three games were played in the Městský stadion in Ostrava.

They played their first competitive match on 17 October 2013 against Croatia which ended in a thumping 7-0 victory for the Croats. Two days later they played the Czech Republic which resulted in a 3-0 defeat for the Gibraltarians before being thumped 7-0 yet again although this time by Cyprus. The team went 3 years without scoring a goal from 2016, until 2019 when they played in an under-19 tournament hosted by Chinese Taipei. In the first game on 28 September 2019, a Julian Del Rio hat-trick saw Gibraltar under-19s achieve their first ever victory, against Hong Kong.

Recent results and fixtures

Players

Current squad
For the 2023 UEFA European Under-19 Championship qualification and finals, players born on or after 1 January 2004 are eligible. Players in bold have caps for the under-21 side.

The following players were called up for the following 2023 UEFA European Under-19 Championship qualification matches:

 Match date: 21, 24 and 27 September 2022
 Opposition: ,  and 
 Caps and goals correct as of: 27 September 2022, after the game against .

Recent call-ups
The following players have been called up within the past twelve months or withdrew from the current squad due to injury or suspension, and remain eligible.

INJ Withdrew from the squad due to an injury
PRE Preliminary squad
WD  Withdrew for other reasons

Managerial history 
  Terrence Jolley (2013–2016)
  Jansen Moreno (2016–2017)
  Stephen Head (2017–2018)
  Steve Cummings (2018–2020)
  Malcolm Martin (2020–)

Top Goalscorers
As of 27 September 2022

Players with an equal number of goals are ranked in order of average.

See also 
 Football in Gibraltar
 Gibraltar Football Association

Notes

References

External links
Official site of the Gibraltar Football Association
UEFA Under-19 Profile
Unofficial website about Gibraltarian football, futsal and national team

European national under-19 association football teams
under-19